Alojzy Wir-Konas (born Alojzy Konas, 1894–1940) was a military commander in the Polish Army, commanding the 38th Infantry Division during the Invasion of Poland. He was murdered in the Katyn massacre.

Early life and career
Alojzy Konas was born in Maków Podhalański. He joined the Polish Legions during World War I. About that time he adopted the nom de guerre of Wir (Polish for whirlwind), which later became part of his surname. After the Oath crisis he was drafted into the Austro-Hungarian Army and sent to the Italian front, where he fought with distinction in shock battalion near . After the war, in November 1918 he joined the Polish Army and steadily advanced through its ranks. Between 1924 and 1930 he commanded the Pińsk-based Polish 84th Infantry Regiment. Promoted to the rank of Colonel, until August 1939 he commanded the infantry units of the Polish 21st Mountain Infantry Division.

The 1939 Nazi–Soviet invasion of Poland
During the Invasion of Poland in 1939 he was the commanding officer of the Polish 38th Infantry Division, formed of reserve units between Tarnów and Kraków. Due to the fast pace of the German advance, the division entered combat on September 9, before it could be fully mobilized. From September 11, it was attached to the improvised Małopolska Army and was withdrawing towards the Romanian Bridgehead. Under the leadership of Gen. Kazimierz Sosnkowski, Wir-Konas commanded his division in the battle of Sądowa Wisznia, in which he managed to defeat the much stronger German 2nd Mountain Division. However, shortly before reaching Lwów, the unit became bogged down in the battle of Janów of September 17. Despite offering heavy resistance, only a single regiment managed to break through enemy lines and reach the besieged city.

Katyn
After the capitulation of Lwów to the Soviet Union on September 22, 1939, Alojzy Wir-Konas was arrested by the NKVD and imprisoned in the Starobielsk concentration camp. He was murdered in the Katyn massacre in April 1940. For his wartime service he was posthumously promoted to the rank of General. Among the Katyn victims were 14 Polish generals including Leon Billewicz, Bronisław Bohatyrewicz, Xawery Czernicki (admiral), Stanisław Haller, Aleksander Kowalewski, Henryk Minkiewicz, Kazimierz Orlik-Łukoski, Konstanty Plisowski, Rudolf Prich (murdered in Lwow), Franciszek Sikorski, Leonard Skierski, Piotr Skuratowicz, and Mieczysław Smorawiński.

References

1894 births
1940 deaths
People from Maków Podhalański
Polish generals
Polish Army officers
Katyn massacre victims
Polish military personnel killed in World War II
Polish people of World War II
Polish people who died in Soviet detention
Polish people who died in prison custody
Polish murder victims
Polish prisoners and detainees
Polish people executed by the Soviet Union
Executed people from Lesser Poland Voivodeship